Hamdi Nouh (born 23 April 1954) is an Egyptian football manager.

References

Living people
Egyptian footballers
Al Mokawloon Al Arab SC players
Ismaily SC players
Egypt international footballers
Competitors at the 1978 All-Africa Games
Competitors at the 1979 Mediterranean Games
Egyptian football managers
Al Mokawloon Al Arab SC managers
Egyptian Premier League managers
1954 births
Association footballers not categorized by position